Aculepeira lapponica is an orb-weaving spider found in Sweden, Finland and Russia.

See also 
 List of Araneidae species: A

References

External links 

Aculepeira
Spiders of Europe
Spiders of Russia
Spiders described in 1945